Emiliano Massimo (born 11 October 1989) is an Italian footballer who plays as a defensive midfielder for Monterosi FC.

Club career
Born in Rome, Massimo finished his youth career with Roma's youth setup, but left for Aversa Normanna in July 2009 in a co-ownership deal. In June 2011 he returned to Roma.

On 24 June 2012 Massimo joined Avellino, again in a co-ownership; he also took part of the squad who won the 2012–13 Lega Pro Prima Divisione. On 26 June 2013, he renewed his link with the Biancoverdi, running until 2016.

On 14 September Massimo made his Serie B debut, coming on as a second-half substitute in a 0–1 loss at Virtus Lanciano; he scored his first goal ten days later, netting his side's only in a draw at Pescara.

On 10 July 2018, he joined Taranto in the Serie D on a one-year contract.
In June 2019, play in the Serie D for Monterosi FC.

References

External links

1989 births
Living people
Footballers from Rome
Association football midfielders
Italian footballers
Serie B players
Serie C players
Serie D players
A.S. Roma players
U.S. Avellino 1912 players
S.F. Aversa Normanna players
S.S. Ischia Isolaverde players